In number theory and mathematical logic, a Meertens number in a given number base  is a natural number that is its own Gödel number. It was named after Lambert Meertens by Richard S. Bird as a present during the celebration of his 25 years at the CWI, Amsterdam.

Definition 
Let  be a natural number. We define the Meertens function for base   to be the following:

where  is the number of digits in the number in base ,  is the -prime number, and 

is the value of each digit of the number. This corresponds to a Gödel encoding.

For example, the number 3020 in base  is a Meertens number, because 
.

All numbers are in base .

See also
 Arithmetic dynamics
 Dudeney number
 Factorion
 Happy number
 Kaprekar's constant
 Kaprekar number
 Narcissistic number
 Perfect digit-to-digit invariant
 Perfect digital invariant
 Sum-product number

References

External links 
 

Arithmetic dynamics
Base-dependent integer sequences